Mozingo Lake is a  reservoir in Nodaway County, Missouri on Mozingo Creek.

The reservoir was completed in 1994.  Water overflowed its dam in the Great Flood of 1993.

External links
Mozingo Lake Recreation Park
Maryville, Missouri

Reservoirs in Missouri
Buildings and structures in Nodaway County, Missouri
Protected areas of Nodaway County, Missouri
Bodies of water of Nodaway County, Missouri